Patrice Rio (born 15 August 1948 in Le Petit-Quevilly, Seine-Maritime) is a French former football defender who obtained a total number of 17 international caps for the France national football team in the 1970s. Playing for FC Nantes (1970–1984) he was a member of the French squad that competed at the 1978 FIFA World Cup. His father, Roger, was also a French international footballer.

Titles
French championship in 1973, 1977, 1980 and 1983 with FC Nantes
Coupe de France in 1979 with FC Nantes

References

 French Football Federation Profile 
 

1948 births
Living people
People from Le Petit-Quevilly
Sportspeople from Seine-Maritime
French footballers
France international footballers
Association football defenders
1978 FIFA World Cup players
FC Rouen players
FC Nantes players
Stade Rennais F.C. players
Ligue 1 players
Ligue 2 players
Footballers from Normandy